This is a list of mountain passes in Kyrgyzstan.

Kyrgyzstan geography-related lists
Lists of landforms of Kyrgyzstan

Kyrgyzstan